A seps is a legendary snake from medieval bestiaries. They were said to have extremely corrosive venom that liquefied their prey.

The seps is described as "a small snake which consumes with its poison not just the body but the bones" in the medieval Aberdeen Bestiary. Lucan's Pharsalia refers to its appearance and the effects of its poison.

Shelley in Prometheus Unbound writes:

See also
Tetradactylus

References

Medieval European legendary creatures
Legendary serpents